The 2014 Wales Summit of the North Atlantic Treaty Organization (NATO) was a meeting of the heads of state and heads of government of the NATO countries, held in Newport, Wales on 4 and 5 September 2014. Such summits are sporadically held and allow leaders and officials from NATO Allies to discuss current issues of mutual concern and to plan strategic activities. The 2014 summit has been described by US Navy Admiral James G. Stavridis as the most important since the fall of the Berlin Wall.

Background
The summit was hosted by British Prime Minister David Cameron. Attendees included Canadian Prime Minister Stephen Harper, US President Barack Obama, German Chancellor Angela Merkel, French President François Hollande, Italian Prime Minister Matteo Renzi and Spanish Prime Minister Mariano Rajoy.

There were another 180 VIPs, and 4,000 delegates and officials from approximately 60 countries.

The official logo for the summit included a panel with four quadrants, each bearing a stylised symbol of Newport or Wales: a Celtic knot, the Welsh Dragon, Newport Transporter Bridge and a Welsh castle. The entrance to the venue was fronted by a full-scale replica of a Eurofighter Typhoon.

Agenda

World leaders met at the Celtic Manor, and informally at other locales in and around Cardiff. They discussed ongoing events in the world, such as terrorism, cyberwarfare, and other areas of national security interest to the member states.

Ukrainian President Petro Poroshenko had a joint discussion with EU big four leaders and US President Barack Obama before the official start of the Summit, to discuss the crisis with Russia.

Outcomes

The following declarations and agreements were made at the Summit:
Wales Summit Declaration
Joint Expeditionary Force agreement
 NATO Readiness Action Plan
 NATO Security Capacity Building Initiative
 Armed Forces Declaration
Joint Statement of the NATO-Ukraine Commission
Declaration on Afghanistan
The Wales Declaration on the Transatlantic Bond

Russia and Ukraine
Immediately prior to the summit on 3 September 2014 French President François Hollande announced the postponement of delivery of the first Mistral-class amphibious assault ship which had been sold to Russia, a ship provisionally named , due to the Russia–Ukraine crisis.

At the end of the summit Ukrainian President Poroshenko announced the Minsk Protocol, a ceasefire which had been agreed with the separatist leader Alexander Zakharchenko under terms proposed by Russian President Vladimir Putin. The protocol was cautiously welcomed by NATO leaders.

On 12 September 2014 the EU announced a much wider expansion of its sanctions programme over the Russia-Ukraine conflict.

On 12 September a communiqué of the US Treasury announced a sweeping ban on the Russian defense sector.

Wales Pledge
For the first time, the Allies formally pledged to aim to move towards what had previously been an informal guideline based on Article 3 of spending 2% of their gross domestic products on defense, and 20% of that on new equipment. For countries which spend less than 2% they agreed upon that these countries "aim to move towards the 2% guideline within a decade". This pledge was the brainchild of US Secretary of Defence Chuck Hagel. In 2015, five of its 28 members met that goal. At the beginning of 2018, eight of the 29 members either were meeting the target or were close to it; six others had laid out plans to reach the target by 2024 as promised; and Norway and Denmark had unveiled plans to substantially boost defense spending (including Norway's planned purchase 52 new F-35 fighter jets).

Support for Military Intervention Against ISIL

On 5 September 2014, the U.S., Australia, Canada, Denmark, France, Germany, Italy, Turkey, and the United Kingdom, agreed to support anti-ISIL forces in Iraq and Syria with supplies and air support.

Criticism
A retired German politician, former  defense Parliamentary Secretary of State (until 2002) in the SPD's First Schröder cabinet and former head of the Stockholm International Peace Research Institute (until 1991), criticized the summit agenda for its focus on military details and not political perspectives. Stützle said that the Russian Federation was not a military threat to NATO but criticized that new NATO members' policies were not détente and negotiation with the Russian Federation.

Protestors and security detail

Businesses in the vicinity of security fencing in Cardiff reported a drop in trade by up to a third. This fencing was based on and expanded, the 'National Barrier Asset' which is held in reserve for similar events.

Security included around 9,500 specially trained police officers patrolling the streets of the two cities, military helicopters including US Osprey V22s and the Royal Navy's new £1bn Type 45 destroyer  stationed in Cardiff Bay.

Protests, demonstrations, and marches took place in Newport and Cardiff involving several hundred people, though the turnout was much lower than predicted.

Leaders and other dignitaries in attendance

Member states

Non-member states and organisations

NATO Foreign ministers
  Albania – Minister of Foreign Affairs Ditmir Bushati
  Belgium – Minister of Foreign Affairs Didier Reynders
  Bulgaria – Minister of Foreign Affairs Daniel Mitov
  France – Minister of Foreign Affairs Laurent Fabius
  Germany – Foreign Minister Frank-Walter Steinmeier
  Italy – Foreign Minister Federica Mogherini
  Norway – Minister of Foreign Affairs Børge Brende
  Spain – Minister of Foreign Affairs and Cooperation José Manuel García-Margallo
  United Kingdom – Foreign Secretary Philip Hammond
  United States – Secretary of State John Kerry

See also 
 Article 3 of the North Atlantic Treaty

References

External links 

 NATO Summit Wales 2014
 2014 NATO Summit Media information
  Łukasz Kulesa (www.europeanleadershipnetwork.org): NATO at a Crossroads – Again: Recommendations for the Newport Summit, PDF (14 p.)

Diplomatic conferences in the United Kingdom
2014 conferences
2014 in international relations
2014 in Wales
21st-century diplomatic conferences (NATO)
NATO summits
Events in Newport, Wales
2014 pro-Russian unrest in Ukraine
United Kingdom and NATO
2014 in British politics
History of Newport, Wales
September 2014 events in the United Kingdom
Events in Cardiff